Netherlands competed at the 2020 Summer Paralympics in Tokyo, Japan, from 24 August to 5 September 2021. This was their sixteenth consecutive appearance at the Summer Paralympics since 1960.

Medalists

| width="78%" align="left" valign="top" |

| width="22%" align="left" valign="top" |

Competitors

Officials 

Retired Dutch wheelchair tennis player Esther Vergeer is Chef de Mission of the Dutch delegation for the 2020 Summer Paralympics.

Athletics 

Seventeen athletes have qualified to compete at the 2020 Summer Paralympics.

Track & road events
Men

Women

Field events
Men

Women

Badminton 

Megan Hollander has qualified to compete.

Boccia

Cycling 

Jennette Jansen, Chantal Haenen, Caroline Groot, Larissa Klaassen, Imke Brommer, Alyda Norbruis, Jetze Plat, Mitch Valize, Tim de Vries, Daniel Abraham, Vincent ter Schure, Timo Fransen, Tristan Bangma and Patrick Bos have all qualified to compete.

Road
Men

Women

Track 
Men

Women

Equestrian 

The Netherlands qualified for the 2020 Summer Paralympics after reaching 2nd place in the 2018 FEI World Equestrian Games. Equestrian riders included are Rixt van der Horst, Frank Hosmar, Maud de Reu and Sanne Voets. 

Qualification Legend: Q= Qualified for freestyle test

Paratriathlon 

Jetze Plat, Geert Schipper and Margret IJdema have all qualified to compete.

Rowing

Netherlands qualified one boat in the mixed double sculls for the games by winning the silver medal at the 2019 World Rowing Championships in Ottensheim, Austria and securing the second of eight available place.

Qualification Legend: FA=Final A (medal); FB=Final B (non-medal); R=Repechage

Swimming 

Five Dutch swimmers have qualified to compete in swimming at the 2020 Summer Paralympics via the 2019 World Para Swimming Championships slot allocation method & 10 qualified via MQS.
Men

Women

Table tennis

Two female players have qualified to compete.

Women

Wheelchair basketball

Women's tournament
The women's wheelchair basketball team qualified for the 2020 Summer Paralympics after their results at the 2018 Wheelchair Basketball World Championship.

Group B

Quarter-final

Semi-final

Final

Wheelchair tennis

Netherlands qualified eight players entries for wheelchair tennis. All of them qualified by the world rankings.

See also 

 Netherlands at the Paralympics
 Netherlands at the 2020 Summer Olympics

References

External links 
 NOC*NSF - National Paralympic Committee of the Netherlands
 2020 Summer Paralympics website

Nations at the 2020 Summer Paralympics
2020
Summer Paralympics